Verkhnedonskoy District is an administrative and municipal district (raion), one of the forty-three in Rostov Oblast, Russia. It is located in the north of the oblast. Its administrative center is the rural locality (a stanitsa) of Kazanskaya. Population: 20,441 (2010 Census);  The population of Kazanskaya accounts for 23.1% of the district's total population.

Notable residents 

Dmitri Kartashov (born 1994 in Kazanskaya), football player

References

Notes

Sources

Districts of Rostov Oblast